Hla Thein (born 25 April 1944) is a Burmese long-distance runner. He competed in the marathon at the 1968 Summer Olympics and the 1972 Summer Olympics.

References

External links
 

1944 births
Living people
Athletes (track and field) at the 1968 Summer Olympics
Athletes (track and field) at the 1972 Summer Olympics
Burmese male long-distance runners
Burmese male marathon runners
Olympic athletes of Myanmar
Southeast Asian Games medalists in athletics
Southeast Asian Games gold medalists for Myanmar
Southeast Asian Games silver medalists for Myanmar